Yoshinori Okihara (沖原 佳典, born July 27, 1972 in Matsuyama, Ehime, Japan) is a former Nippon Professional Baseball infielder.

External links

1972 births
Living people
Baseball people from Ehime Prefecture
Nippon Professional Baseball infielders
Hanshin Tigers players
Tohoku Rakuten Golden Eagles players
Olympic baseball players of Japan
Baseball players at the 2000 Summer Olympics
Japanese baseball coaches
Nippon Professional Baseball coaches